The 1994–95 Hong Kong First Division League season was the 84th since its establishment.

League table

References
1994–95 Hong Kong First Division table (RSSSF)

Hong Kong First Division League seasons
1994–95 in Asian association football leagues
First Division